Fibroblast growth factor 4 is a protein that in humans is encoded by the FGF4 gene.

The protein encoded by this gene is a member of the fibroblast growth factor (FGF) family. FGF family members possess broad mitogenic and cell survival activities and are involved in a variety of biological processes including embryonic development, cell growth, morphogenesis, tissue repair, tumor growth and invasion. This gene was identified by its oncogenic transforming activity. This gene and FGF3, another oncogenic growth factor, are located closely on chromosome 11. Co-amplification of both genes was found in various kinds of human tumors. Studies on the mouse homolog suggested a function in bone morphogenesis and limb development through the sonic hedgehog (SHH) signaling pathway.

Function 

During embryonic development, the 21-kD protein FGF4 functions as a signaling molecule that is involved in many important processes. Studies using Fgf4 gene knockout mice showed developmental defects in embryos both in vivo and in vitro, revealing that FGF4 facilitates the survival and growth of the inner cell mass during the postimplantation phase of development by acting as an autocrine or paracrine ligand. FGFs produced in the apical ectodermal ridge (AER) are critical for the proper forelimb and hindlimb outgrowth. FGF signaling in the AER is involved in regulating limb digit number and cell death in the interdigital mesenchyme. When FGF signaling dynamics and regulatory processes are altered, postaxial polydactyly and cutaneous syndactyly, two phenotypic abnormalities collectively known as polysyndactyly, can occur in the limbs. Polysyndactyly is observed when an excess of Fgf4 is expressed in limb buds of wild-type mice. In mutant limb buds that do not express Fgf8, the expression of Fgf4 still results in polysyndactyly, but Fgf4 is also able to rescue all skeletal defects that arise from the lack of Fgf8. Therefore, the Fgf4 gene compensates for the loss of the Fgf8 gene, revealing that FGF4 and FGF8 perform similar functions in limb skeleton patterning and limb development. Studies of zebrafish Fgf4 knockdown embryos demonstrated that when Fgf4 signaling is inhibited, randomized left-right patterning of the liver, pancreas, and heart takes place, showing that Fgf4 is a crucial gene involved in developing left-right patterning of visceral organs. Furthermore, unlike the role of FGF4 in limb development, FGF4 and FGF8 have distinct roles and function independently in the process of visceral organ left-right patterning.
Fgf signaling pathway has also been demonstrated to drive hindgut identity during gastrointestinal development, and the up regulation of the Fgf4 in pluripotent stem cell has been used to direct their differentiation for the generation of intestinal Organoids and tissues in vitro.

FGF4 Retrogenes 
In canines the FGF4 retrogene insertion on chromosome 18 is involved in the short leg phenotype. This is still a member of the FGF4 gene family. Fibroblast Growth Factor 4 is a protein coding gene, meaning it's a structural protein molecule. The biological role that FGF4-18 plays is important in embryological development, specifically appropriate growth. In canines, the developmental structure this retrogene mutation patterning leads to is shortened legs due to the defects in endochondral ossification.These mutations and FGF signaling abnormalities are also linked in humans with dwarfism by preventing bones from growing to the normal length. This FGF4 retrogene on not only chromosome 18 but also 12 leads to shortened limbs and abnormal vertebrae associated with intervertebral disc disease. Research done at University of California-Davis has found that FGF4 retrogene on chromosome 12 is also attributed to the short legs and abnormal intervertebral disc that degenerate. This particular FGF4-12 retrogene in canines leads to the short limb phenotype from dysplastic shortened long bones, premature degeneration, and calcification of the intervertebral disc; which gives a susceptibility to IVDD (intervertebral disc disease).

References

Further reading